Chhume Gewog is a gewog (village block) of Bumthang District, Bhutan. The dominant local language is Bumthang, a close relation to Dzongkha.

References

Gewogs of Bhutan
Bumthang District